Jacob Anderson was Archdeacon of Selkirk from 1936 until 1942.

Anderson was born in Lockport, Manitoba in 1875. He began his working life as a teacher.  After that he enrolled at St. John's College, Manitoba and was ordained in 1902. After a curacy at Gilbert Plains he held incumbencies in Dominion City, Rathwell, Selkirk and Stonewall.

He died on 26 January 1962.

Notes

University of Manitoba alumni
Archdeacons of Selkirk
Canadian Anglican priests
Canadian educators
1875 births
1962 deaths